Southern Railway Depot, also known as Ninety Six Depot, is a historic train station located at Ninety Six, Greenwood County, South Carolina. It was built in 1915 by the Southern Railway, and is a combination passenger and freight depot. It is a one-story, rectangular brick building with a flared hipped roof, bay window, station master's room, and segregated waiting rooms.

It was listed on the National Register of Historic Places in 2011.

References

Ninety Six
Railway stations on the National Register of Historic Places in South Carolina
Railway stations in the United States opened in 1915
National Register of Historic Places in Greenwood County, South Carolina
Former railway stations in South Carolina